Une nuit à l'Assemblée Nationale (A Night at the National Assembly) is a 1988 French comedy film directed by Jean-Pierre Mocky.

Plot
Walter Arbeit, an ecologist practising naturism, accompanies his mayor and MP, Dugland, to Paris where he is to be awarded the Legion of Honour. Soon after their arrival, Walter discovers that Dugland committed fraud in order to obtain this distinction. Annoyed, he walks the halls of the National Assembly, causing panic among the service staff.

Cast

 Jean Poiret as Octave Leroy
 Michel Blanc as Walter Arbeit
 Jacqueline Maillan as Henriette Brulard
 Roland Blanche as Marius Agnello
 Bernadette Lafont as Madame Dugland
 Luc Delhumeau as Aimé Dugland
 Michel Francini as Colonel Raoul Dugommier
 Martyne Visciano as Marie-Hermine Leroy
 Isabelle Mergault as Fernande
 Dominique Zardi as Fricasset
 Jean Benguigui as Marcel
 Darry Cowl as Kayser
 Jean Abeillé as Plumet
 Jean-Pierre Clami as Delapine
 François Toumarkine as Tutti-Frutti
 Sophie Moyse as Olympe
 Louis Sautelet as Jean-François
 Marjorie Godin as Madame Boulet
 Josiane Balasko as The journalist
 Vadim Cotlenko as The President of the National Assembly

References

External links

1988 films
1988 comedy films
French comedy films
1980s French-language films
Films directed by Jean-Pierre Mocky
1980s French films